Iorga is a Romanian surname that may refer to:
Laurențiu Iorga (born 1988), Romanian football midfielder 
Leo Iorga (born 1964), Romanian guitarist and singer
Nicolae Iorga (1871–1940), Romanian historian, politician, literary critic, memoirist, poet and playwright
Vasile Iorga (born 1945), Romanian wrestler 

The term may also refer to:
Iorga, a village in Manoleasa Commune, Botoșani County

Romanian-language surnames